Platyrhinus is a genus of beetles belonging to the family Anthribidae.

The species of this genus are found in Europe.

Species:
 Platyrhinus aculeatus Schönherr, 1839 
 Platyrhinus albinus Billberg, 1820

References

Anthribidae